Otago Glacier is a glacier about 20 nautical miles (37 km) long draining the northeast side of Mount Markham and entering Nimrod Glacier just east of Svaton Peaks. Named by the northern party of the New Zealand Geological Survey Antarctic Expedition (NZGSAE) (1961–62) for the University of Otago, New Zealand.

References 

Glaciers of Shackleton Coast